Malcolm Sheppard (born February 13, 1988) is a former American football defensive tackle. He was signed by the Houston Texans as an undrafted free agent in 2010. He played college football at Arkansas.

Sheppard also played for the Tennessee Titans.

Early years
Sheppard attended Bainbridge High School in Bainbridge, Georgia.

College career
Sheppard started the first four games at defensive tackle in 2007 for the Arkansas Razorbacks, but started for the last eight games of the season at his normal position of defensive end. He made 42 tackles, 0.5 sacks, and 10.5 tackles-for-loss in 2007. He moved from defensive end to defensive tackle in the 2008 offseason. Sheppard was named Razorbacks defensive player of the year in 2008 after he made 7.5 sacks, the most by a defensive lineman in the Southeastern Conference. He earned second-team preseason All-SEC honors following the 2008 season. In 2009, head coach Bobby Petrino named Sheppard a team captain.

Professional career

Houston Texans
Sheppard was signed by the Houston Texans as an undrafted free agent following the 2010 NFL Draft on May 7, 2010. He was waived during final cuts on September 3, but was re-signed to the team's practice squad on September 5. He was promoted to the active roster on October 25 to play in the week 8 game against the Indianapolis Colts, but was inactive for the following four weeks before he was waived on November 30. He was re-signed to the team's practice squad on December 7.

Tennessee Titans
Sheppard was signed off the Texans' practice squad by the Tennessee Titans on December 14, 2010.

San Jose SaberCats
Sheppard signed with the San Jose SaberCats of the Arena Football League on May 28, 2013.

Personal life
Sheppard nearly lost his left eye when he was seven years old after his brother, Zenard, accidentally shot him with a wooden arrow. He now sees out of his right eye only due to the blurriness of the left.

References

External links
Tennessee Titans bio
Houston Texans bio
Arkansas Razorbacks football bio

1988 births
Living people
Players of American football from Augusta, Georgia
American football defensive ends
American football defensive tackles
Arkansas Razorbacks football players
Houston Texans players
Tennessee Titans players
San Jose SaberCats players